Soho Press is a New York City-based publisher founded by Juris Jurjevics and Laura Hruska in 1986 and currently headed by Bronwen Hruska. It specializes in literary fiction and international crime series. Other works include published by it include memoirs. Its Young Adult imprint Soho Teen, which focuses on YA mysteries and thrillers.

Soho Press releases an average of 90 titles per year. Its fiction backlist holds titles from several notable authors, such as National Book Award finalist Edwidge Danticat (Krik? Krak!), Sue Townsend (Adrian Mole: The Lost Years), Maria Thomas (Antonia Saw the Oryx First), Jake Arnott (Long Firm-C), John L'Heureux (The Handmaid of Desire), Delores Phillips, and Jacqueline Winspear, recipient of the Agatha Award.

Soho Crime

Soho Crime is a department of Soho Press that focuses on exotic crime series. It has produced works from widely read authors like Cara Black, Stuart Neville, Colin Cotterill, Timothy Williams, and Peter Lovesey. Each crime novel or series explores a foreign country or exotic culture. Settings have included Paris, Bath, Northern Ireland, Laos, South Korea, Guadeloupe, Japan, Australia, Brazil, Bristol, Madrid, and Berlin.

Soho Constable
Soho Constable was a co-publishing venture with UK publisher Constable & Robinson, through which Soho Press releases British procedural mysteries in the United States. Authors have included Alison Bruce, David Dickinson, Suzette A. Hill, Pat McIntosh, R.T. Raichev, James Craig, and Barbara Cleverly.

References

External links
 Soho Press

Publishing companies of the United States
Companies based in New York City
Publishing companies established in 1986
American companies established in 1986
1986 establishments in New York (state)